Bluff River  may refer to:

 Bluff River (New Zealand)
 Bluff River (New South Wales), Australia
 Bluff River (Murchison River), a river of Tasmania
 Bluff River (Prosser River), Tasmania; see Levendale, Tasmania

See also 
 River Bluff (disambiguation)